Love and Blood is a 1951 Italian-German action melodrama film directed by Marino Girolami and starring Maria Montez in one of her last roles. It was also known as City of Violence. The film's art direction was by Max Mellin and Rolf Zehetbauer.

A separate German-language version Shadows Over Naples was also made, directed by Hans Wolff.

Cast

References

Bibliography

External links 
 
 
 Film information at Mariamontez.org

1951 films
1951 crime drama films
Italian crime drama films
West German films
1950s Italian-language films
Italian multilingual films
Films directed by Marino Girolami
Films about the Camorra
German crime drama films
1950s German-language films
Films directed by Hans Wolff
Films set in Italy
Films set in Naples
German multilingual films
1950s multilingual films
Melodrama films
Films scored by Renzo Rossellini
Italian black-and-white films
1950s Italian films
1950s German films